Finn Bjørnseth (15 July 1924 – 24 November 1973) was a Norwegian novelist, poet and short story writer.

Finn Bjørnseth was born in Oslo, Norway. He made his literary début in 1950 with the short story collection Unge netter. Among his poetry collections are 60-tallsballade from 1960, and Vuggevise for aftenlandet from 1962. He was awarded the Gyldendal's Endowment in 1960.

Selected works
Før vingene bærer (1952) 
De tre diktsyklusene Syv septimer (1954)
Vandreren (1955) 
Til minne om en klode (1955) 
Et ildens barn (1960)
Den innerste esken (1966)
Hans Eksellense hadde tre sønner (1969)
Noen å være glad i (1959) 
En barhodet pike (1961) 
Fordi (1963)
Fra de nakne ordene (1965) 
Logos (1972)

References

1924 births
1973 deaths
Writers from Oslo
20th-century Norwegian novelists
20th-century Norwegian poets
Norwegian male poets
Norwegian male novelists
20th-century Norwegian male writers